Queen of Angels Academy was a private Catholic high school for girls in Compton, California.

History 
It was established in 1995 through the merger of two all-girl schools, St. Michael's High School in Los Angeles, and Regina Caeli High School. 

The academy occupied the campus of the former Regina Caeli High School, a school with a 99% minority student body, administered by the Sisters of the Holy Family, a congregation of African-American religious sisters.

In December 2001 the Archdiocese of Los Angeles announced that the academy would close at the end of the current school year, citing declining enrollment and the high level of subsidy by the archdiocese as major factors. 

The following year, the building was converted for use as St. Albert the Great Middle School, part of the parochial school located across the street.

References

External links
 Catholic School Enrollment for Upcoming Year Looks Stable - The Tidings

Educational institutions established in 1995
Girls' schools in California
Compton, California
Educational institutions disestablished in 2002
Defunct schools in California
Defunct Catholic secondary schools in California
African-American Roman Catholic schools
1995 establishments in California
2002 disestablishments in California
Sisters of the Holy Family (Louisiana)